The 2002–03 Serbian Hockey League season was the 12th season of the Serbian Hockey League, the top level of ice hockey in Serbia. Five teams participated in the league, and HK Vojvodina Novi Sad won the championship.

Regular season

Playoffs

Semifinals
HC Novi Sad – Spartak Subotica (10–0, 5–1)
HK Vojvodina Novi Sad – KHK Crvena Zvezda (10–4, 8–4)

Final
HK Vojvodina Novi Sad – HC Novi Sad (12–5, 7–2)

External links
Season on hockeyarchives.info

Serbian Hockey League
Serbian Hockey League seasons
Serb